Lissner may refer to:

People

 Caren Lissner (born 1973), novelist and essayist
 Ernst Lissner (1874–1941), was a Russian painter
 Holger Lissner (born 1938), priest
 Ignatius Lissner (1867–1948), priest
 Isidor Lissner (1832–1902), politician
 Ivar Lissner (1909–1967), journalist and spy
 Ray Lissner (1903–1944), American filmmaker

Places
 Lissner, Queensland, former suburb in Charters Towers, Australia
 Boer War Veterans Memorial Kiosk and Lissner Park, heritage site in that suburb